Sankhadhar Sākhwā (Nepal Bhasa:) (also spelt Sankhadhar Sākhwāl) was a legendary Nepalese philanthropist who allegedly paid the debts of the Nepalese people in 879 CE. This event is commemorated as the beginning of the epoch of Nepal Sambat.

According to Bhasa Bamsali and Rajbhogmala Bamsawali, in 879, an astrologer from Bhaktapur predicted sand at the confluence of the Bisnumati and Bhadramati rivers would turn into gold if gathered at the right moment. Raja Ananda Malla, the king of Bhaktapur at the time sent out workers to collect the sand, which was seen by Sākhwā, then a local merchant. He understood that it must be extraordinary sand and he instantly bought it. The next day, Sākhwā found that all the sand had turned into gold, and instead of using the gold for himself, he used it to pay off everyone's debts. On 18 November 1999(2056-08-02 BS), the government declared Sankhadhar Sakhwa as one of the National heroes of Nepal. On 26 October 2003, the Department of Postal Service issued a commemorative postage stamp depicting his portrait.

See also
The Legend of Shankhadhar
Nepal Sambat

References

External links
Sankhadhar Sakhwa
Sankhadhar Sakhwa Biography

Newar
People from Kathmandu
Founders
National heroes of Nepal
9th-century Nepalese people
Newar people
Nepalese philanthropists
People whose existence is disputed